Locked On Records is a British record label, concentrating on UK garage and grime music. Founded in 1996 in London by Tarik Nashnush who was working at the record shop Pure Groove at the time, it is a subsidiary of XL Recordings. Among the artists signed to the label are The Streets, Todd Edwards, Zed Bias, Dem 2, Tuff Jam, and Artful Dodger.

Notable artists

Artful Dodger
Danny J Lewis
Dem 2
Doolally
El-B
Leee John
Michael Watford
Monsta Boy
Nu-Birth
Phuturistix
The Streets
Todd Edwards
Tuff Jam
Wideboys
Zed Bias

See also
 UK garage
 List of Locked On Records artists
 List of Locked On Records singles

References

External links

British independent record labels
Electronic music record labels
Beggars Group
UK garage record labels